Fressin is a commune in the Pas-de-Calais department in the Hauts-de-France region of France.

Geography
Fressin nestles in the valley of the Planquette, one of several small rivers that flow through the region known as the 'Seven Valleys'. Mixed arable and dairy farming is the predominant occupation of the inhabitants.

Population

Places of interest

 Ruins of the fortress built in the early 15th century by Jean de Créquy, one of the first Knights of the Golden Fleece, counsellor and chamberlain to Philip the Good.
 The church of St. Martin, dating from the fifteenth century. Large and impressive for such a small village. Two information boards tell in English the history of the church and village.
 Another smaller chateau, dating from the eighteenth century.

Notable people
 Georges Bernanos, poet and writer, spent his youth here until 1924.

See also
Communes of the Pas-de-Calais department

References

External links

 Site of the Association du Château de Fressin 
 Fressin le Pays des 7 Vallées et son Foyer Rural 
 Annuaire-Mairie website 

Communes of Pas-de-Calais